Girdle of Venus may refer to:

Girdle of Aphrodite, a magical accessory of Aphrodite/Venus
The belt of Venus, an atmospheric phenomenon
An alternative name for the chastity belt
The girdle of Venus, a minor line in palmistry
Venus girdle, Cestum veneris, a species of comb jelly